

The IAR-814, aka  MR-2, was a Romanian designed and built twin-engined trainer aircraft built in the early 1950s, the first twin-eninged aircraft wholly designed and built in Romania.

Design
The IAR 814 was a three-seat low-wing monoplane of mixed construction, primarily designed as a trainer, but could also serve as a transport. Power was supplied by two Walter Minor 6-III engines and the aircraft was also equipped with blind-flying instrumentation and radios. The main-wheels of the tai-wheel undercarriage retracted into the rear of the engine nacelles. The two prototypes and 8 production aircraft were registered as YR-MRA to YR-MRJ.

Operational history

Variants
 IAR-814 Two prototype trainer/light transport aircraft
 MR-2 Production aircraft; 8 built

Specifications

References

Further reading
 

1950s Romanian military trainer aircraft
814
Aircraft first flown in 1953